Romy Timmins (born 21 April 1989) is an Australian rules footballer who played for the Western Bulldogs in the AFL Women's competition. Timmins was recruited by the Western Bulldogs as a rookie selection in October 2016 after having previously played basketball. She played two matches in her debut season. She was delisted at the conclusion of the 2017 season.

References

External links 

1989 births
Living people
Western Bulldogs (AFLW) players
Australian rules footballers from Victoria (Australia)